Tanya Ling (born Calcutta 1966) is an artist, designer and fashion illustrator.

Ling studied at Central Saint Martins College of Art and Design in London (graduating in 1989) before working in Paris in the design studio of Christian Lacroix.  On her return to London she started a contemporary art gallery with her husband William Ling called Bipasha Ghosh.

An exhibition of her own drawings (1996) in the studio of artist Gavin Turk on London's Charing Cross Road led to a commission from British Vogue and a subsequent career as a fashion illustrator.  Ling has made work for many of the world's leading fashion publications and fashion businesses including Harper's Bazaar, Vogue, Louis Vuitton and Selfridges.

In 2002 Ling launched her own ready-to-wear collection, which was featured in the windows of Henri Bendel on 5th Avenue, New York where the collection was sold. In the following year British Vogue named her one of the most important trend-setters in Britain and The Observer Magazine announced her as their designer of the year. Her A/W 2003 collection was shown at the Institute of Contemporary Arts in London. She was appointed (2009) as the Creative Director of Veryta, a new Ready-to-Wear collection founded by Filippo Binaghi and Stefano Pilati to support the Veryta Foundation.

In 2011 over fifty of her drawings were acquired by the Victoria and Albert Museum in London. In 2014, a group of her paintings and sculptures were acquired for the Murderme collection. 

Ling's solo exhibition "We Have Life," held in London in 2017, featured a prominent theme of horses. In an interview with Vanessa Murrell published via DATEAGLE ART, Ling revealed her lifelong love of horses, stemming from her childhood days of drawing and dreaming about these majestic creatures. "Like many young girls, I just loved horses," Ling shared. "I used to draw them constantly and, while most girls were into riding horses, I just wanted to be one."

References

External links
Ling's Official website
Tanya Ling Fine Art
Tanya Ling Interview in the Telegraph, 2015

1966 births
Living people
Ling
Alumni of Central Saint Martins
Artists from Kolkata
Women artists from West Bengal
Fashion illustrators